Mathis Landwehr (born 30 May 1980) is a German actor and film producer. He appeared in more than thirty films since 2002.

Selected filmography

References

External links 

1980 births
Living people
German male film actors
German male television actors
21st-century German male actors